Niall Ronan (born 14 September 1982) is a retired Irish rugby union player, who played for Leinster, Munster and Ireland during his career. He played as a flanker.

Early years
Ronan grew up playing Gaelic football and represented the Meath county team in the All-Ireland Minor Football Championship. He won the Senior Schools Leinster Championships in 2000 with St. Mary's, Drogheda.

Leinster
Switching from football to rugby, he played at underage level for Leinster and Ireland, and spent four seasons with Leinster.

Munster
Ronan moved to Munster in 2007, and made his debut against Scarlets in September of that year. He was in the Munster team that beat Leinster to win the 2011 Magners League Grand Final.

A knee injury sustained in Munster's Heineken Cup Round 5 clash with Castres Olympique ruled Ronan out for the rest of the 2011–12 season. He signed a new two-year contract with Munster in March 2012.

Ronan earned his 100th cap for Munster on 3 May 2013, coming on against Zebre in a Pro12 fixture. On 30 April 2014, it was announced that Ronan was retiring from rugby due to a knee injury sustained in October 2013.

Ireland
Ronan made his debut for Ireland against Canada on 23 May 2009, starting and finishing the match in a 25–6 win. He earned his second cap a week later against the USA. He was called up to the squad for the 2010 Summer Tour as a replacement for Kevin McLaughlin and played against the Barbarians, New Zealand Māori and Australia.

Ronan also played for Ireland against Scotland in a 2011 Rugby World Cup warm-up on 6 August 2011.

References

External links
Leinster profile
Munster profile
IRFU profile
Ireland Wolfhounds profile
ESPNscrum profile

1982 births
Living people
Gaelic footballers who switched code
Meath Gaelic footballers
Ireland international rugby union players
Ireland Wolfhounds international rugby union players
Ireland international rugby sevens players
Irish rugby union players
Leinster Rugby players
Munster Rugby players
Shannon RFC players
Rugby union flankers
Rugby union players from County Meath